Éxitos Eternos may refer to:

Albums
 Éxitos Eternos (Soraya album)
 Éxitos Eternos (Mijares album)
Éxitos Eternos, compilation album of Celia Cruz 
Éxitos Eternos, compilation album of Yndio
Éxitos Eternos, compilation album of Marc Anthony 
Éxitos Eternos, compilation album of Frankie Ruiz
Éxitos Eternos, compilation album of Oscar D'Leon  
Éxitos Eternos, compilation album of Tito Nieves